The 2016–17 Nebraska Cornhuskers men's basketball team represented the University of Nebraska in the 2016–17 NCAA Division I men's basketball season. The Cornhuskers, led by fifth-year coach head coach Tim Miles, played their home games at Pinnacle Bank Arena in Lincoln, Nebraska and were members of the Big Ten Conference. They finished the season 12–19, 6–12 in Big Ten play to finish in a tie for 12th place. As the No. 12 seed in the Big Ten tournament, they lost in the first round to Penn State.

Following the season, Nebraska athletic director Shawn Eichorst indicated that Tim Miles would return as head coach for Nebraska.

Previous season
The Cornhuskers finished the 2015–16 season 16–18, 6–12 in Big Ten play to finish in 11th place in conference. In the Big Ten tournament, they defeated Rutgers and Wisconsin to advance to the quarterfinals where they lost to Maryland.

Departures

Incoming transfers

2016 Signing class

2017 Recruiting Class

Roster

}

Schedule and results

|-
!colspan=9 style=| Exhibition

|-
!colspan=9 style=| Non-conference Regular Season

|-
!colspan=9 style=|Big Ten regular season

|-
!colspan=9 style=|Big Ten tournament

Rankings

*AP does not release post-NCAA tournament rankings

References

Nebraska
Nebraska Cornhuskers men's basketball seasons
Corn
Corn